The following is a list of the  largest notable information technology consulting firms in the world, along with their corporate headquarters location and the total number of consultants they have. Many of these serve primarily as third-party consultants and outsourcing partners. Many enterprise software companies employ their own consultants for services related to their own products. Among the corporations listed below, the number of consultants listed is less than their total number of employees.

Note: Not all employees of these firms are consultants and firms with less than 10,000 employees are not included.

By continent

Asia

Europe

North America

South America

Defunct entities
 marchFIRST, Inc.

References

 
Lists of information technology companies
IT consulting